James Henry Lawrence Archer or Lawrence-Archer (28 July 1823 - 14 February 1889) was a British soldier, collector of botanical specimens, and author best known for his guide to the Monumental Inscriptions of the British West Indies.

Early life
James Henry Lawrence Archer (his surname also given as Lawrence-Archer) was born in 1823, son of James Henry Archer (b. 1798), MD, and Mary, third daughter of Alexander Edgar, of a Lanarkshire family; the name "Lawrence" came from his mother's family, her grandmother, Rachael, being daughter of Lawrence Lawrence, who Lawrence-Archer claimed to be related to the Lawrence baronets of Iver, Buckinghamshire. The Archer family were Scottish armigers, and Lawrence-Archer had maternal ancestors resident in Jamaica.

Career
Lawrence-Archer was gazetted second lieutenant in the 39th Regiment in 1840, later serving with the 24th Regiment during the Second Anglo-Sikh War from 1848 to 1849. He served with the 60th King's Royal Rifle Corps, being gazetted captain in 1855, and went on half-pay with the rank in 1869; later holding the rank of major, he remained on the half-pay list until his death.

He collected botanical specimens during his military service, such as the seeds from China that he offered to William Jackson Hooker, director of the Royal Botanic Gardens, Kew, along with other botanical samples that he had personally collected in Mauritius, Anjer, Ascension and St Vincent.

As an author he is best known for his guide to the Monumental Inscriptions of the British West Indies. A branch of the Archer family were resident first in Barbados and then in Jamaica.

Death and legacy
Lawrence-Archer died at Umberslade Parva in Warwickshire on 14 February 1889. His address was also given as Bedford Park, Chiswick, now in London. He left an estate of £100. A prolific correspondent, letters from Lawrence-Archer are held by a number of archives, including Kew Gardens, the National Library of Scotland, and the British Library which holds his genealogical notes on West Indian families.

Selected publications
 Brief Memorials of English Families of the Name of Archer. J. H. Lawrence-Archer, Edinburgh, 1856.
 The Indian Mutinies Accounted For, etc. Ward & Co, London, 1857.
 An Account of the Sirname Edgar: And Particularly of the Family of Wedderlie in Berwickshire. J. C. Hotten, London, 1873.
 Monumental Inscriptions of the British West Indies &c. Chatto and Windus, London, 1875.
 Commentaries on the Punjab Campaign, 1848-49: Including Some Additions to the History of the Second Sikh War, from Original Sources. W. H. Allen & Co, London, 1878.
 The Orders of Chivalry &c.. W. H. Allen and Co., London, 1885.
 The British Army: Its regimental records, badges, devices, etc. G. Bell & Sons, London, 1888.

References 

1823 births
1889 deaths
British non-fiction writers
British genealogists
British antiquarians
King's Royal Rifle Corps officers
British military personnel of the Second Anglo-Sikh War